Tomás Gutiérrez Ferrer (born 29 December 1940 in Guayama, Puerto Rico – died on 2 February 2018 in Guayama, Puerto Rico) was a Puerto Rican basketball player who competed in the 1964 Summer Olympics and in the 1968 Summer Olympics.

In 1961, Gutiérrez won the BSN Most Valuable Player Award as he led the Leones de Ponce to a championship.

References

External links 
 
 Gutierrez accolades at BSN

1940 births
2018 deaths
People from Guayama, Puerto Rico
Puerto Rican men's basketball players
1963 FIBA World Championship players
1967 FIBA World Championship players
Leones de Ponce basketball players
Olympic basketball players of Puerto Rico
Basketball players at the 1964 Summer Olympics
Basketball players at the 1968 Summer Olympics
Basketball players at the 1963 Pan American Games
Basketball players at the 1967 Pan American Games
Pan American Games medalists in basketball
Pan American Games bronze medalists for Puerto Rico
Medalists at the 1963 Pan American Games